is a Japanese singer.

Biography 

She graduated from the University of the Sacred Heart in Tokyo with a degree in philosophy.

Haneda made her debut as a recording artist with her album Beating Mess in 1988.  Several of her songs have appeared on television commercials in Japan, with her initial single, "Encore," featured in the Fuji Television drama series Dakishimetai! (抱きしめたい!).

Since the late 1990s, Haneda has been noted for her cover versions of works by Western artists.  Her albums since her 1997 release Good Times, Bad Times have encompassed genres including fado, tango, jazz, and American show tunes.

Discography

Albums 
{| class="wikitable"
|-
! Year !! Title !! Release date
|-
| 1988 || Beating Mess || March 21, 1988
|-
| 1989 || Sora || August 21, 1989
|-
| 1997 || Good Times, Bad TimesReissued in 2005 on Domo Records || June 1997
|-
| 2002 || Love in the Hands || June 19, 2002
|-
| 2005 || Aire de TangoCollaboration with Kiyoshi Shiga || March 2005
|-
| 2008 || fadista || June 2008
|-
| 2010 || Music Trip -Aranjuez-Collaboration with Trio The Trip || July 27, 2010
|-
| 2012 || 'Changes- || February 25, 2012

|}

 Singles 

 Contributions to other works 

|2019 || 6 Underground

ReferencesThis article incorporates material from the corresponding article in the Japanese Wikipedia.''

External links
 https://millionbreath.com

1966 births
Living people
Japanese women singers
Singers from Tokyo
Domo Records artists